Alan Digorsky, better known as Emir Saad, is an Islamist militant and the first leader of the Ossetian Jamaat Kataib al-Khoul which later became part of the Caucasus Front's North Ossetian Sector in Russia's republic of North Ossetia–Alania during the Second Chechen War.

Not much is publicly known about Digorsky. His name, if genuine, would indicate that he is an ethnic Ossetian. When Kataib al-Khoul's existence was mentioned for the first time he was notified as its leader. Since the creation of the Caucasus Emirate in 2007, his forces strive to end Russian control of North Ossetia and establish an Islamic state based on Sharia law. Although Ossetian Muslims are a minority group in the republic, Digorsky has been relatively active in his guerrilla campaign so far, claiming credit for the killings of several high-ranking officials and other attacks.

References

External links
The Truth about the “Kataib al-Khoul” Ossetian Jamaat
AUTHORITIES REFUSE TO RECOGNIZE INSURGENCY IN NORTH OSSETIA
Kata'ib al-Khoul Aliases: Jamaat Kataib al-Khoul, Kataeb al-Ghoul, Kataib al-Khoul, Kataib al-Khoul Jamaat

Caucasian Front (militant group)
Ossetian people
People of the Chechen wars
Russian Islamists
Russian rebels
Living people
Year of birth missing (living people)